Joseph Szekely (February 2, 1925 – October 16, 1995) was an American professional baseball player, an outfielder who played professionally for six seasons (1949–1954) and who appeared in five Major League games for the  Cincinnati Redlegs.

His son, Joe Szekely, a catcher in minor league baseball from 1982 to 1992, is a longtime minor league manager and instructor who spent the 2011 season as a coach in the Tampa Bay Rays' organization.

The elder Szekely debuted in the major leagues on September 13, 1953, as the starting right fielder in a doubleheader against the Pittsburgh Pirates at Crosley Field. He went hitless in seven at bats that day. Two unsuccessful at bats as a pinch hitter extended Szekely's hitless skein to nine. But in what would be his final Major League game on September 27, he started in right field against star Milwaukee Braves lefthander Warren Spahn — a future Hall of Famer — and collected his only MLB hit, a single, in four times at bat. All told, he batted 13 times in the Majors, scored no runs, and struck out three times.

His minor league career was spent in two circuits, the Double-A Texas League and the Class B Big State League.

References

External links

Major League Baseball right fielders
Cincinnati Redlegs players
Shreveport Sports players
Texarkana Bears players
Tulsa Oilers (baseball) players
Baseball players from Ohio
People from Paris, Texas
1925 births
1995 deaths